Ejaz may refer to:

 Ejaz Lakdawala, alleged gangster
 Sardar Ejaz Afzal Khan, politician
 Ejaz Ahmad Khan, ex-Guantanamo Bay detainee
 Sanna Ejaz, Pakistani Pashtun human rights activist